Israel Arnold Ziff OBE (31 January 1927 – 14 July 2004) was a British businessman and philanthropist, who particularly donated to good causes within Leeds, West Yorkshire.  He was made a Freeman of the City of London in 1979 and received an OBE in 1981. From 1991 to 1992 he was High Sheriff of West Yorkshire.

Life
Ziff's family was of Russian/German origin.  He was born 31 January 1927 in Leeds and attended both Roundhay School and Leeds University, where he studied economics, but did not complete the degree, being called up for national service.  He inherited his father's shoe company Stylo, and formed property company Town Centre Securities in 1959.  A notable development was the Merrion Centre, Leeds.

In 1952 he married  Marjorie Esther Morrison (born 26 May 1929). They had 2 sons,  Michael (born 1953) and Edward (born 1960) who continued his business, as CEOs of Stylo and Town Centre Securities respectively.  Arnold and Marjorie also had a daughter, Ann Louise

Arnold's wife, Marjorie Ziff received an MBE in the 2011 New Year Honours for services to the community in Leeds.

Benefactions

Ziff was a major sponsor of Tropical World, Roundhay Park which is now named after him.  Likewise his gifts to the University of Leeds are commemorated in the Marjorie and Arnold Ziff building, which is home to student services at the university after being opened in 2010.  He gave to Jewish welfare organizations, and is commemorated in the Marjorie and Arnold Ziff Community Centre in Moortown, Leeds.  He was also a patron of the arts, and had a collection including items from his friend, Rowland Emett.

Further reading
Nigel Watson (2005) Arnold Ziff: The Making of a Great Yorkshireman (Vallentine Mitchell)

References

Guardian 30 July 2004 Arnold Ziff
Timesonline 31 July 2004 It's business as usual, Arnold Ziff's heirs insist

1927 births
2004 deaths
Businesspeople from Leeds
English people of Russian descent
English philanthropists
English Jews
Officers of the Order of the British Empire
People educated at Roundhay School
High Sheriffs of West Yorkshire
20th-century British philanthropists
20th-century English businesspeople